Melphina noctula, the brown forest swift, is a butterfly in the family Hesperiidae. It is found in Guinea, Ivory Coast, Ghana, Nigeria, Cameroon, the Central African Republic and Uganda. The habitat consists of undisturbed forests.

References

Butterflies described in 1909
Erionotini